Kwun Lung  is one of the 15 constituencies in the Central and Western District.

The constituency returns one district councillor to the Central and Western District Council, with an election every four years. The seat was held by Fergus Leung Fong-wai of the Localist.

Kwun Lung constituency is loosely based on the area around Kwun Lung Lau in Kennedy Town with estimated population of 15,273.

Councillors represented

Election results

2010s

2000s

1990s

Notes

Citations

References
2011 District Council Election Results (Central & Western)
2007 District Council Election Results (Central & Western)
2003 District Council Election Results (Central & Western)
1999 District Council Election Results (Central & Western)

Constituencies of Hong Kong
Constituencies of Central and Western District Council
Kennedy Town
Constituencies established in 1994
1994 establishments in Hong Kong